The 2014–14 NEC women's basketball season began with practices in October 2015, followed by the start of the 2014–15 NCAA Division I women's basketball season in November. Conference play started in early January 2015 and concluded in March with the 2015 Northeast Conference women's basketball tournament.

Preseason

Rankings

() first place votes

All-NEC team

NEC regular season

Conference matrix
This table summarizes the head-to-head results between teams in conference play.

Postseason

NEC tournament

  March 8–15, 2015 Northeast Conference Basketball Tournament.

All games will be played at the venue of the higher seed

NCAA tournament

Honors and awards

See also
2014–15 Northeast Conference men's basketball season

References

External links
NEC website